Nathaniel Ruggles (November 11, 1761 – December 19, 1819) was a U.S. Representative from Massachusetts.

Born in Roxbury in the Province of Massachusetts Bay, Ruggles graduated from Harvard University in 1781, studied law, was admitted to the bar, and practiced law in his native town. He was appointed judge of the general sessions in 1807, and chief justice of Massachusetts in 1808.
He was elected as a Federalist to the Thirteenth, Fourteenth, and Fifteenth Congresses (March 4, 1813 – March 3, 1819). He died in Roxbury on December 19, 1819.

References

1761 births
1819 deaths
Harvard University alumni
19th-century American politicians
Federalist Party members of the United States House of Representatives from Massachusetts